7 and 8 King Street  are a pair of historic houses situated on King Street in Bristol, England.

They date from 1665. During restoration in 1976 it was found that recycled ships timbers had been used for much of the oak studding and bracing in the buildings, and barrel staves had been used as laths. The oriel window of number 7 is an original feature, whilst the windows of number 8 were replaced during the eighteenth century.

7 and 8 King Street have been designated by English Heritage as a grade II* listed building.

References

Bristol, King Street, 07 and 8
Grade II* listed buildings in Bristol
Houses in Bristol
Timber framed buildings in England
1665 establishments in England